This is a list of the members of the unicameral National Assembly of Botswana between 2014 and 2019. There were 63 seats in the assembly consisting of 57 MPs directly elected from constituencies, 4 specially elected MPs and 2 ex officio members; who were elected in the 2014 election.

Graphical representation

List of MPs elected in the general election

References

 2014
National Assembly 2014